Kõlleste Parish was a rural municipality of Estonia, in Põlva County.

Villages
Häätaru - Ihamaru - Karaski - Karilatsi - Krootuse - Palutaja - Piigaste - Prangli - Tõdu - Tuulemäe - Veski - Voorepalu

Visitor attractions
Põlva Peasant Museum is in Karilatsi village.

References

External links